Persoonia dillwynioides, commonly known as Fitzgerald persoonia, is a species of flowering plant in the family Proteaceae and is endemic to a restricted area in the south-west of Western Australia.

Description

Taxonomy
Persoonia dillwynioides was first formally described in 1856 by Carl Meissner in de Candolle's Prodromus Systematis Naturalis Regni Vegetabilis.

Distribution and habitat
Fitzgerald persoonia occurs within  of the coast of the south-west of Western Australia between the Gairdner River and Hopetoun where it grows in low heath.

Conservation status
This geebung is classified as "not threatened" by the Western Australian Government Department of Parks and Wildlife.

References

dillwynioides
Flora of Western Australia
Plants described in 1856
Taxa named by Carl Meissner